The 2015–16 Georgetown Hoyas women's basketball team will represent Georgetown University in the 2015–16 college basketball season. The Hoyas, led by second year head coach Natasha Adair and are members of the Big East Conference. The Hoyas will play their home games at the McDonough Gymnasium. They finished the season 16–14, 9–9 in Big East play to finish in a tie for fifth place. They lost in quarterfinals of the Big East women's tournament to St. John's. They were invited to the Women's National Invitation Tournament where they lost to Rutgers in the first round.

Roster

Schedule

|-
!colspan=9 style="background:#002147; color:#8D817B;"| Non-conference regular season

|-
!colspan=9 style="background:#002147; color:#8D817B;"| Non-conference regular season

|-
!colspan=9 style="background:#002147; color:#8D817B;"| Big East Women's Tournament

|-
!colspan=9 style="background:#002147; color:#8D817B;"| WNIT

See also
2015–16 Georgetown Hoyas men's basketball team

References

Georgetown
Georgetown Hoyas women's basketball seasons
2016 Women's National Invitation Tournament participants